The 2005 Philadelphia Soul season was the second season of the Philadelphia Soul. The Soul finished 6–10 on the season and missed the playoffs. The Soul got off to a great start, with a 66–35 win over the Austin Wranglers. But after Week 5, the Soul had 2 wins and 3 losses, leading to the firing of head coach Michael Trigg, and the signing of replacement head coach James Fuller.

Schedule

External links
2005 Schedule at arenafan.com

Philadelphia Soul Season, 2005
Philadelphia Soul seasons
2005 in sports in Pennsylvania